Christian Galenda (born 18 January 1982) is a freestyle swimmer from Italy, who won the bronze medal in the men's individual 100 metres freestyle event at the 2004 European Championships. He represented his native country a couple of months later at the 2004 Summer Olympics in Athens, Greece. He was born in Dolo.

See also
 Italian swimmers multiple medalists at the international competitions

References

External links
 

1982 births
Living people
Italian male medley swimmers
Swimmers at the 2004 Summer Olympics
Swimmers at the 2008 Summer Olympics
Olympic swimmers of Italy
People from Dolo
Italian male freestyle swimmers
World Aquatics Championships medalists in swimming
Medalists at the FINA World Swimming Championships (25 m)
European Aquatics Championships medalists in swimming
Mediterranean Games gold medalists for Italy
Swimmers at the 2005 Mediterranean Games
Mediterranean Games medalists in swimming
Sportspeople from the Metropolitan City of Venice
20th-century Italian people
21st-century Italian people